Eberwein is a surname. Notable people with the surname include:

Carl Eberwein (1786–1868), German composer and violinist
Jürgen Eberwein, German figure skater
Lily Eberwein (1900–1980), Sarawakian nationalist and women's right activist
Michael Eberwein (born 1996), German footballer